Convicted is a 1950 American crime film noir directed by Henry Levin and starring Glenn Ford and Broderick Crawford. It was the third Columbia Pictures film adaptation of the 1929 stage play The Criminal Code by Martin Flavin, following Howard Hawks's The Criminal Code (1931) and John Brahm's Penitentiary (1938).

Plot
This prison drama is the story of Joe Hufford (Glenn Ford), a man convicted of manslaughter. George Knowland (Broderick Crawford) is the warden who understands Hufford, helps him adjust to prison life and recognize that he has a future after release. Hufford witnesses the murder of an informer by another convict, Malloby (Millard Mitchell), but he sticks to the prison's "silent code" and refuses to talk, even though it means he will be accused of the killing. He is locked in solitary confinement. In the end, the real murderer confesses and Hufford escapes the electric chair. He obtains his release and, having fallen in love with the warden's daughter, (Dorothy Malone), ensures he has permission from Knowland to pursue a relationship with her.

Cast
 Glenn Ford as Joe Hufford
 Broderick Crawford as George Knowland
 Millard Mitchell as Malloby
 Dorothy Malone as Kay Knowland
 Carl Benton Reid as Captain Douglas
 Frank Faylen as Convict Ponti
 Will Geer as Convict Mapes
 Martha Stewart as Bertie Williams
 Henry O'Neill as Detective Dorn
 Douglas Kennedy as Det. Bailey 
 Roland Winters as Vernon Bradley, Attorney
 Ed Begley as Mackay – Head of Parole Board
 Ray Teal as Cell Block / Yard Guard (uncredited)

Reception
The staff at Variety magazine wrote, Convicted isn't quite as grim a prison film as the title would indicate. It has several off-beat twists to its development, keeping it from being routine. While plotting is essentially a masculine soap opera, scripting [from a play by Martin Flavin] supplies plenty of polish and good dialog to see it through."

References

External links
 
 
 
 
 
 Convicted informational essay at Turner Classic Movies by Nathaniel Thompson

1950 films
1950 crime drama films
American crime drama films
1950s English-language films
American black-and-white films
Film noir
Films scored by George Duning
1950s prison films
Columbia Pictures films
Films directed by Henry Levin
American prison drama films
1950s American films